Terestrombus terebellatus, common name : the little auger conch,  is a species of sea snail, a marine gastropod mollusk in the family Strombidae, the true conchs.

Description
Adult shell size in this species varies between 25 mm and 54 mm.

Distribution
This species is distributed in the Red Sea, the Indian Ocean along the Chagos Atoll, in the Pacific Ocean along Japan, Fiji and Northwest Australia.

References

 Walls, J.G. (1980). Conchs, tibias and harps. A survey of the molluscan families Strombidae and Harpidae. T.F.H. Publications Ltd, Hong Kong

External links
 

Strombidae
Gastropods described in 1842